Marius Bonnet (12 October 1921 – 26 July 2003) was a French racing cyclist. He rode in the 1947 and 1948 Tour de France.

References

External links
 

1921 births
2003 deaths
French male cyclists
Cyclists from Marseille